"Coming Home" is a song by British drum and bass duo Sigma and British singer Rita Ora. The song was released on 6 November 2015.

Music video
The music video for "Coming Home" was released on 5 November 2015 at a total length of three minutes and twenty seconds. The video features Sigma walking in the forest amongst a group of people while Rita sings in a vacant house. The video ends as Sigma, Ora and others have Christmas dinner together.

Live performances
Sigma and Ora performed the song on The X Factor on 29 November 2015. They also performed on the Top of the Pops which aired on Christmas Day 2015.

Use in media
It was featured in a montage during BBC Sport's coverage of the Abu Dhabi Grand Prix. It was also used during Goal of the Month and Goal of the Season on Match of the Day. The acoustic version was used in the eighth episode of the season two of the American TV series, Supergirl.

Track listing

Charts and certifications

Weekly charts

Certifications

Release history

References

2015 singles
2015 songs
Sigma songs
Rita Ora songs
Song recordings produced by TMS (production team)
Songs written by Wayne Hector
Songs written by Tom Barnes (songwriter)
Songs written by Ben Kohn
Songs written by Peter Kelleher (songwriter)